German Ju-Jutsu (or German Jiu-Jitsu) is a martial art related to traditional Japanese Jujutsu, developed in Germany in the 1960s using techniques from Jujutsu, Judo, Karate and various other traditional and modern martial arts.  Its governing body in Germany is the DJJV (Deutscher Ju-Jutsu Verband). Its competitive sport aspects are coordinated internationally by the JJIF (Ju-Jitsu International Federation); Ju-jutsu under JJIF rules is a part of the World Games and World Combat Games. The system is taught to the German police forces.

Terminology 

In Germany, the term Ju-Jutsu is virtually always taken to refer to German ju-jutsu, whereas other styles related to Japanese jujutsu are normally called Jiu Jitsu.

History 
In 1967, members of the Deutsche Dan-Kollegium (DDK, German Dan Council) started developing a
new self-defense system mainly based on Judo, Karate, and Aikido. Judo and Aikido are derived from traditional Japanese Jujutsu. A lot of emphasis was put on techniques which could be used in real-life situations. Over the years, experience from police work and techniques from other martial arts have influenced the system. In 2000, additional techniques from Arnis, Sambo, Wing Chun, Muay Thai and other martial arts were officially incorporated into German ju-jutsu.

Techniques 

German ju-jutsu includes atemi, elbow techniques, kicks, knee strikes, throws, ground techniques (taken from judo), various locks, pressure points, and armed techniques, among others, covering all distances. Training includes defense against multiple opponents. Even in the early days, because of the art's mixed origin, practitioners combined strikes and blocks from karate, judo-style throws and grappling techniques, as well as aikido-style joint locks.

Combat sport 
Several different competition systems exist. Considering that Jujutsu in certain other European countries has undergone modernization processes that have led to styles similar to German ju-jutsu, international competitions are possible. The German Ju-Jutsu Association was one of the three founding members of the Ju-Jitsu International Federation (JJIF, originally called the European Ju-Jitsu Federation, EJJF), which has focused on developing the sport aspect of Western jujutsu styles. The JJIF is now an international sport federation with national associations in over 70 countries.

At the world level, there are two competition systems: The duo system involves a pair of practitioners (jujutsuka) from the same team demonstrating self-defence techniques against attacks randomly called by the mat referee. The fighting system involves one-on-one combat. In the fighting system, three phases are distinguished, each with slightly different rules. The round begins in the distance fighting phase. Once a grab has been made, the second phase is entered and hits are no longer allowed. The third phase is entered when the jujutsuka are down on the mat. Switching back and forth between all phases is possible, that is, if the jujutsuka managed to stand up again, the first or second phase would recommence.

Customs 

The customs are akin to those used in other Japanese budō disciplines:

 Training is performed in a dojo.
 Jujutsugi or judogi are worn.
 A kyu/dan ranking system is used.

Grandmasters

References

External links 
 Deutscher Ju-Jutsu Verband (German Ju-Jutsu Association) 

European martial arts
German martial arts
Jujutsu